Yilonaayili is a community in Tamale Metropolitan District in the Northern Region of Ghana. It is located along the Tamale-Bolgatanga trunk road. The community has nucleated settlement. The people there are predominantly farmers.

See also
Kulmanga

References 

Communities in Ghana
Suburbs of Tamale, Ghana